Ann D. Duplessis is a Democratic former member of the Louisiana Senate for the Second District. She held the seat from 2004 to 2010, when she resigned to enter the administration of Mayor Mitch Landrieu of New Orleans.

References

External links
Project Vote Smart - Senator Ann Duplessis (LA) profile
Follow the Money - Ann Duplessis
2007 2005 2003 campaign contributions

Living people
Louisiana state senators
Women state legislators in Louisiana
Politicians from New Orleans
Year of birth missing (living people)
21st-century American women